Leucopogon canaliculatus is a species of flowering plant in the heath family Ericaceae and is endemic to the south-west of Western Australia. It is an erect shrub with more or less glabrous branchlets, linear leaves and white flowers arranged in clusters at the ends of branches.

Description
The edges of the leaves are rolled under, obscuring most of the lower surface and forming a longitudinal groove.

Taxonomy and naming
Leucopogon canaliculatus was first formally described in 2009 by Michael Clyde Hislop in the journal Nuytsia from specimens collected north of Scaddan in 2002. The specific epithet (canaliculatus) means "channelled", referring to the groove on the lower surface of the leaves.

Distribution and habitat
This leucopogon usually grows in mallee woodland and heath in a narrow band from near Grass Patch to Kau Rock Nature Reserve north of Condingup in the Esperance plains and Mallee bioregions of south-western Western Australia.

Conservation status
Leucopogon canaliculatus is classified as "not threatened" by the Western Australian Government Department of Biodiversity, Conservation and Attractions.

References

canaliculatus
Ericales of Australia
Flora of Western Australia
Plants described in 2009